Marot is a surname, and may refer to:
 Bernard Marot (fl. 1610–1650), French surgeon and ship's captain
 Clément Marot (1496–1544), French poet
 Daniel Marot  (1661–1752), French Protestant architect, furniture designer and engraver
 Helen Marot (1865–1940), American writer, librarian, and labor organizer
 Irene Marot (born 1951), British actress
 Jean Marot (1463–c.1526), French poet, father of Clément
 Jean Marot (architect) (1619–1679), French architect and engraver of architectural views
 Károly Marót (1885–1963), Hungarian classical scholar and philologist
 Péter Marót (born 1945), Hungarian fencer
 Véronique Marot (born 1955), French marathon runner

and to:
 Marót, the Hungarian name for Moroda village, Seleuș Commune, Arad County, Romania

See also
 
 

 Maret (disambiguation)
 Marriott (disambiguation)
 Merit (disambiguation)